Buchter is a surname. Notable people with the surname include:

Ryan Buchter (born 1987), American baseball player
Tineke Buchter, better known as Tina Strobos (1920–2012), Dutch psychiatrist who rescued Jews during the Holocaust

See also
Butcher (surname)